The men's singles competition at the 2023 FIL World Luge Championships was held on 29 January 2023.

Results
The first run was held at 10:03 and the second run at 11:38.

References

Men's singles